This is a list of diplomatic missions in Benin. At present, the capital city of Cotonou hosts 25 embassies.

Diplomatic missions in Cotonou

Embassies

Other missions or delegations 
 (Embassy office)
 (Delegation)
 (Representative office)
 (Embassy office)

Consular missions

Cotonou 
 (Consulate-General)
 (Consulate)
 (Consulate-General)

Non-resident embassies 
In Abuja, Nigeria except as noted.

 (Paris)

 (Paris)

 (Abidjan)
 (Paris)

 (Ouagadougou)
 (Paris)

 (Paris)

 (Paris)
 (Lagos)

 (Abidjan)
 (Algiers)

 (London)
 (Accra)
 (Valletta)

 (New York City)

 (Paris)
 (Algiers)

 (Rabat)

 (Paris)

 (Accra)
 (New York City)

 (Accra)

 (New York City)

 (Paris)
 (Rabat)

References 

Diplomatic missions
Diplomatic missions
Benin
Diplomatic missions